Chronic may refer to: 
 Chronic (cannabis), a slang name for high quality marijuana
 Chronic condition, a condition or disease that is persistent or otherwise long-lasting in its effects
 Chronic toxicity, a substance with toxic effects after continuous or repeated exposure
 Chronic (film), a 2015 American film
 The Chronic, a 1992 album by Dr. Dre
 The Chronic 2001, a.k.a. 2001, a 1999 album by Dr. Dre

See also
Cronic, surname
Kronic (disambiguation)
Chronos, a personification of time in Greek mythology
 Habit (psychology), routines of behavior that are repeated regularly